Faxonius jeffersoni, the Louisville crayfish, is a species of crayfish in the family Cambaridae. It is endemic to Kentucky.

References

External links

Cambaridae
Fauna of the United States
Endemic fauna of Kentucky
Freshwater crustaceans of North America
Crustaceans described in 1944
Taxobox binomials not recognized by IUCN